SmartMoney was The Wall Street Journals magazine of personal business. The finance magazine launched in 1992 by Hearst Corporation and Dow Jones & Company. Its first editor was Norman Pearlstine. In 2010, Hearst sold its stake to Dow Jones. The September 2012 edition was the last paper edition. Its content was merged into MarketWatch in 2013.

SmartMoneys target market was affluent professional and managerial business people needing personal finance information. Regular topics included ideas for saving, investing, and spending, as well as coverage of technology, automotive, and lifestyle subjects including travel, fashion, wine, music, and food.

Notable alumni
 Norman Pearlstine (SmartMoney magazine)—chief content officer of Bloomberg L.P.
 James B. Stewart (SmartMoney magazine)—New York Times columnist
 Gerri Willis (SmartMoney magazine, SmartMoney.com)—CNN anchor

References

Business magazines published in the United States
Monthly magazines published in the United States
Defunct magazines published in the United States
Magazines established in 1992
Magazines disestablished in 2012
Magazines published in New York City
The Wall Street Journal